Epoxide hydrolase 1 is an enzyme encoded by the EPHX1 gene in humans.

Function 

Epoxide hydrolase plays an important role in both the activation and detoxification of exogenous chemicals such as polycyclic aromatic hydrocarbons.

Discovery 

Microsomal epoxide hydrolase 1 (EPHX1) was first isolated by Watabe and Kanehira from rabbit liver  and later also purified from human liver and characterized. EPHX1 belongs to the family of α/β hydrolases  and converts epoxides to diols.

Tissue distribution 

EPHX1 protein can be found predominantly in the membrane fraction of the endoplasmic reticulum of eucaryotic cells. Its expression in mammals is generally the highest in the liver, followed by adrenal gland, lung, kidney, and intestine. It was found also in bronchial epithelial cells  and upper gastrointestinal tract. EPHX1 expression is individually variable among humans  and it can be modestly induced by chemicals as phenobarbital, β-naphtoflavone, benzanthracene, trans-stilbene oxide, etc.

Gene structure and ontology 

Human EPHX1 orthologues were found in 127 organisms. Human microsomal epoxide hydrolase is coded by EPHX1 gene located on chromosome 1 (1q42.12). Three transcription variants differing in the 5´-untranslated region have been identified with length of 455 amino acids.

Function 

Conversion of epoxides to trans-dihydrodiols presents prototypical EPHX1 reaction. EPHX1 has broad substrate specificity. EPHX1 detoxifies low molecular weight chemicals, e.g., butadiene, benzene, styrene, etc., but more complex compounds as polycyclic aromatic hydrocarbons are rather bioactivated to genotoxic species.

EPHX1 mediates the sodium-dependent transport of bile acids into hepatocytes. Androstene oxide and epoxyestratrienol have been shown as endogenous EPHX1 substrates. EPHX1 also metabolizes endocannabinoid 2-arachidonoylglycerol to arachidonic acid and may play an important role in the endocannabinoid signaling pathway.

Clinical significance 

Mutations in EPHX1 have been linked with preeclampsia, elevated blood levels of bile salts (i.e. hypercholanemia), Fetal hydantoin syndrome, and diphenylhydantoin toxicity. Functional single nucleotide polymorphisms (SNPs) in EPHX1 have been found and frequently studied. Two SNPs - Y113H (rs1051740, T337C) and H139R (rs2234922, A416G) – seemed to influence EPHX1 activity in vitro  and their combination was used for deduction of EPHX1 activity. However, their functional effect was not confirmed in human liver microsomes.

Due to the EPHX1 role in metabolism of procarcinogens and existence of gene variations with functional effect a number of association studies has been conducted. Significant associations between EPHX1 SNPs and risk of lung, upper aerodigestive tract, breast, and ovarian cancers have been observed in various populations. Meta-analyses confirmed associations of rs1051740 and rs2234922 SNPs with the risk of lung cancer. Meta-analyses reporting no association of these SNPs with esophageal and hepatocellular cancer risk have been reported as well ). Genetically predicted low EPHX1 activity was associated with increased risk of developing tobacco-related cancer in smokers from 47089 Danish individuals . 
Recent meta-analysis comprising 8,259 patients with chronic obstructive pulmonary disease (COPD) and 42,883 controls reported that the predicted slow activity EPHX1 phenotype is a significant risk factor for COPD in Caucasian, but not in Asian population. Role of EPHX1 expression in pathogenesis of neurodegeneration as Alzheimer´s disease, methamphetamine-induced drug dependence, and cerebral metabolism of epoxyeicosatrienoic acids  was suggested. Modulation of metabolism of epoxyeicosatrienoic acids by EPHX1 may interfere with, e.g., signal transmission of neurons, vasodilation, cardiovascular homeostasis, and inflammation. Transformation of the current knowledge about EPHX1 into clinical applications is, however, limited by the lack of crystal structure of the enzyme and by the complex relations between its genotype and phenotype.

Notes

References

Further reading